A cappello romano (pl. cappelli romani; Italian: "") or saturno (pl. saturni; because its appearance is reminiscent of the ringed planet Saturn) is a prelate's hat with a wide, circular brim and a rounded crown worn outdoors in some countries by Catholic clergy, when dressed in a cassock. 

Unlike many other articles of clerical clothing, the cappello romano serves no ceremonial purpose, being primarily a practical item. (The galero is a ceremonial wide brim hat no longer usually worn. However, on February 19, 2011, Raymond Cardinal Burke became the first cardinal in recent times to wear [for a single photo] the galero.) The cappello romano is not used in liturgical services. Since the general abandonment of the cassock as street dress, it is uncommon even in Rome today. However, it was quite popular there and in some other countries with a Catholic majority population from the 17th century until around 1970.

Description 

The cappello romano is a round, broad-brimmed, low-crowned hat made of either beaver fur, felt or straw and lined in white silk. 

There are some, mostly minor, differences in the designs of cappelli, depending on the rank of the wearer:
 The pope may wear a red cappello with gold cords.
 Cardinals may wear a black cappello with red and gold cords and scarlet lining. They formerly also had the privilege of wearing a red cappello. However, this rule was overturned by Pope Paul VI, and now cardinals' cappelli are black, as are those of all other clerics.
 Bishops may have a black cappello with green and gold cords and violet lining.
 A priest may wear a black cappello with black lining.
 Cappelli romani for deacons and seminarians have no distinguishing features.

See also
 Philippi Collection

Notes

References

External links

Picture of the cappello romano of Pope Benedict XVI
Picture of hand embroidered cappelli romani: red summer cappello romano of Pope Benedict XVI, white summer cappello romano of Pope John XXIII and a black beaver-hair winter variation of an archiepiscopal cappello romano.

Hats
Papal vestments
Catholic clerical clothing